Laurie Weeks may refer to:

 Laurie Weeks (writer), writer and performer based in New York City
 Laurie Weeks (rugby) (born 1986), Australian rugby union footballer